Turbulence is a 2011 British film directed by Michael B. Clifford.

It tells the story of a struggling pub and a local rock band. The film was shot in the Kings Heath area of Birmingham.

References

External links
 

British musical films
British independent films
Films set in Birmingham, West Midlands
2010s musical films
2010s British films